Lewisville can refer to the following places in Pennsylvania:

Lewisville, Chester County, Pennsylvania
Lewisville, Indiana County, Pennsylvania
The former name of Ulysses, Pennsylvania